"One Wild Night" is a song by American rock band Bon Jovi. It was released on April 30, 2001, as a single from their 2001 live album, One Wild Night Live 1985–2001. It was written by Jon Bon Jovi and Richie Sambora, and produced by Sambora, Luke Ebbin and Desmond Child. The song became a chart hit in Europe, reaching the top 10 in seven countries.

Single
The song was originally released on Crush but a new second version appeared on their live album, One Wild Night Live 1985–2001, and a compilation album, Tokyo Road: Best of Bon Jovi and this version was released as a single and featured a music video. The song title has been used as a band name by Bon Jovi tribute bands in several countries.

James Brown is mentioned at the end of the song. The bit entitles that "If James were here, it would be a hit". Richie Sambora on Bon Jovi TV mimicked this transcript which allows many to believe it is him doing the voice, this has never been confirmed.

Charts

Weekly charts

Year-end charts

Release history

References

Bon Jovi songs
2000 songs
2001 singles
Mercury Records singles
Songs written by Richie Sambora
Songs written by Jon Bon Jovi